

Acts of the Northern Ireland Assembly

|-
| {{|Game Preservation (Amendment) Act (Northern Ireland) 2002|ania|2|13-02-2002|maintained=y|archived=n|An Act to amend the Game Preservation Act (Northern Ireland) 1928; and to amend the law relating to the killing, taking or destroying of rabbits and hares.}}
|-
| {{|Budget Act (Northern Ireland) 2002|ania|3|20-03-2002|maintained=y|archived=n|An Act to authorise the issue out of the Consolidated Fund of certain sums for the service of the years ending 31st March 2002 and 2003; to appropriate those sums for specified purposes; to authorise the Department of Finance and Personnel to borrow on the credit of the appropriated sums; to authorise the use for the public service of certain resources for the years ending 31st March 2002 and 2003; and to revise the limits on the use of certain accruing resources in the year ending 31st March 2002.}}
|-
| {{|Local Government (Best Value) Act (Northern Ireland) 2002|ania|4|26-03-2002|maintained=y|archived=n|An Act to make provision placing on district councils a general duty to make arrangements for continuous improvement in the way in which their functions are exercised; and for connected purposes.}}
|-
| {{|Personal Social Services (Preserved Rights) Act (Northern Ireland) 2002|ania|5|26-03-2002|maintained=y|archived=n|An Act to make provision in relation to persons in residential accommodation with preserved rights under the Income Support (General) Regulations (Northern Ireland) 1987; and for connected purposes.}}
|-
| {{|Carers and Direct Payments Act (Northern Ireland) 2002|ania|6|02-05-2002|maintained=y|archived=n|An Act to make provision about the assessment of carers' needs; to provide for services to help carers; to provide for the making of direct payments to persons in lieu of the provision of personal social services or carers' services; and for connected purposes.}}
|-
| {{|Budget (No. 2) Act (Northern Ireland) 2002|ania|7|12-08-2002|maintained=y|archived=n|An Act to authorise the issue out of the Consolidated Fund of certain sums for the service of the year ending 31st March 2003; to appropriate those sums for specified purposes; to authorise the Department of Finance and Personnel to borrow on the credit of the appropriated sums; to authorise the use for the public service of certain resources (including accruing resources) for the year ending 31st March 2003; and to repeal certain spent enactments.}}
|-
| {{|Railway Safety Act (Northern Ireland) 2002|ania|8|13-08-2002|maintained=y|archived=n|An Act to make provision with respect to the safety of railways.}}
|-
| {{|Health and Personal Social Services Act (Northern Ireland) 2002|ania|9|04-10-2002|maintained=y|archived=n|An Act to amend the Health and Personal Social Services (Northern Ireland) Order 1972 in relation to charges for nursing care in residential accommodation; to provide for the establishment and functions of the Northern Ireland Practice and Education Council for Nursing and Midwifery; and for connected purposes.}}
|-
| {{|Social Security Act (Northern Ireland) 2002|ania|10|17-10-2002|maintained=y|archived=n|An Act to amend the law relating to statutory maternity pay; to amend the law relating to maternity allowance; to make provision for work-focused interviews for partners of benefit claimants; to make provision about the use of information for, or relating to, employment and training; to amend the Deregulation and Contracting Out (Northern Ireland) Order 1996; and for connected purposes.}}
|-
| {{|Children (Leaving Care) Act (Northern Ireland) 2002|ania|11|22-11-2002|maintained=y|archived=n|An Act to make provision about children and young persons who are being, or have been, looked after by an authority within the meaning of the Children (Northern Ireland) Order 1995; to replace Article 35 of that Order; and for connected purposes.}}
|-
| {{|Limited Liability Partnerships Act (Northern Ireland) 2002|ania|12|22-11-2002|maintained=y|archived=n|An Act to make provision for limited liability partnerships.}}
|-
| {{|Open-Ended Investment Companies Act (Northern Ireland) 2002|ania|13|22-11-2002|maintained=y|archived=n|An Act to make provision for facilitating the carrying on of collective investment by means of open-ended investment companies and for regulating such companies.}}
|-
| {{|State Pension Credit Act (Northern Ireland) 2002|ania|14|22-11-2002|maintained=y|archived=n|An Act to make provision for and in connection with a new social security benefit called state pension credit; and to amend section 43(1) of the Pension Schemes (Northern Ireland) Act 1993.}}
}}

References

2002